Kurtuluş is a Turkish surname. Notable people with the surname include:

 Edvin Kurtulus (born 2000), Kosovan footballer
 Mehmet Kurtuluş (born 1972), German actor of Turkish descent
 Serdar Kurtuluş (born 1987), Turkish footballer
 Serkan Kurtuluş (born 1990), Turkish footballer
 Tekin Kurtuluş (born 1968), German actor of Turkish descent
 Yekta Kurtuluş (born 1985), Turkish footballer
 Yusuf Kurtuluş (born 1986), Turkish footballer

Turkish-language surnames